Annabel or Annabelle may refer to:

Arts and media
 Annabel (Baum novel), a 1906 novel by L. Frank Baum
 Annabel (Winter novel), a 2010 novel by Kathleen Winter
 "Annabel", a song by Maria Dimitriadi from the film Girls in the Sun
 "Annabel", a song by Goldfrapp from Tales of Us
 "Annabelle", a song by the Mighty Lemon Drops from Sound ... Goodbye to Your Standards
 Annabelle (film), a 2014 American horror film inspired by the doll
 Annabelle: Creation, a 2017 prequel film
 Annabelle Comes Home, a 2019 sequel film
 Annabelle (magazine), a German language women's fashion magazine
 Annabel (band), an emo band from Ohio

People
 Annabelle (given name)
 Annabell, stage name for Anna Sedokova, Ukrainian actress and singer
 Annabel (Japanese singer) (born 1984)
 Annabelle (singer) (born 1967), French singer and actress
 Annabel, a stage name for Evelyn Draper in the film Play Misty for Me

Other uses
 Annabelle, a variety of potato from the Netherlands
 Annabelle, a variety of wild hydrangea
Annabelle (doll), an alleged haunted doll
Annabel's, a nightclub in London, UK
, a US Navy patrol boat in commission from 1917 to 1918

See also
 Anabel (disambiguation)
 Anabel, given name
 Anabelle, given name
 Annabella (disambiguation)
 Anabelle Lee (disambiguation)
 Ann Bell (born 1940), British actress